At Last the 1948 Show is a satirical television show made by David Frost's company, Paradine Productions (although it was not credited on the programmes), in association with Rediffusion London. Transmitted on Britain's ITV network in 1967, it brought Cambridge Footlights humour to a broader audience.

The show starred Tim Brooke-Taylor, Graham Chapman, John Cleese, Marty Feldman and Aimi MacDonald. Cleese and Brooke-Taylor were also the programme editors. The director was Ian Fordyce. Chapman and Cleese would later be among the founders of the Monty Python comedy troupe, and several of the sketches first performed in At Last the 1948 Show would later be performed by Monty Python in various formats.

While only two episodes of the show had been thought to survive, efforts to locate missing episodes have been fruitful, with seven episodes being accounted for by 2013. On 23 October 2014, two episodes were recovered by the British Film Institute from the David Frost collection, and a further two episodes were recovered the following year, making the number of complete episodes eleven out of thirteen.

History
Frost approached Cleese, Chapman and Brooke-Taylor to star in a sketch series. They suggested Marty Feldman, until then a comedy writer. The series bridged the radio series I'm Sorry, I'll Read That Again and television's Monty Python's Flying Circus and The Goodies. It also led to Feldman's television series Marty (which also featured Tim Brooke-Taylor). The convention of comedy scenes interspersed by songs was abandoned. It still used punchlines, which would often be dispensed with in Monty Python's Flying Circus.

Several sketches came from the 1963 Cambridge Footlights Revue entitled Cambridge Circus (the revue was previously entitled A Clump of Plinths), including Graham Chapman's solo routine "One-Man Wrestling". Certain sketches from the show would later be reused in the one-off John Cleese special How to Irritate People ("Freedom of Speech"), as well as the second episode of Monty Python's Fliegender Zirkus ("One-Man Wrestling" again – now with play-by-play commentary added by Cleese – and "Hearing Aid Shop"). Further sketches were reprised in the Python stage shows, including the "Four Yorkshiremen" sketch (as featured on Live at Drury Lane, Live at City Center, Monty Python Live at the Hollywood Bowl, and Monty Python Live (Mostly)), "One-Man Wrestling" once again (Drury Lane, City Center, and Hollywood Bowl), "Secret Service" (Drury Lane only), and a few that have never received official release: "Beekeeper," the aforementioned "Hearing Aid Shop," and "Minister Falling to Pieces." The "Beekeeper" sketch was also performed in the Secret Policeman's Ball stage shows, as were "Top of the Form" and "Take Your Clothes Off!". Another, the "Bookshop" sketch, was recorded in modified form for Monty Python's Contractual Obligation Album. New versions of "Door to Door Undertaker" and "Memory Training Course" were also recorded during that album's sessions, but not included on the final version (they would, however, end up appearing on the widely bootlegged Hastily Cobbled Together for a Fast Buck album). "Psychiatrist", "Tea Boy on a Mission", and "Grublian Holidays" were also performed again by The Two Ronnies.

Monty Python's catchphrase, "And now for something completely different," parodying a phrase often used on Blue Peter, originated in At Last the 1948 Show, and was originally spoken by Aimi MacDonald.

The shows had no relationship to the year 1948; according to Cleese, the title referred to television executives' tendency to dither extensively over commissioning decisions. Feldman claimed in eyE Marty, his posthumously published autobiography, that he came up with the title, which "meant nothing." The series was video-taped at what was later Fountain Studios, Wembley Park, Wembley.

A total of thirteen 25-minute episodes were made within a year, six in the first series and seven in the second.

Survival of episodes
Thames Television discarded the material once they had acquired the Rediffusion London archive, and all but two episodes were destroyed. John Cleese became aware of tapes from two surviving episodes after Feldman's wife left them to him in her will. Five compilation episodes for Swedish television also survived. Much missing material has been recovered in video, and surviving video has been restored by the British Film Institute.

The majority of a previously missing episode (season 2, episode 6 tx 31.10.67) was recovered from a private collector in May 2010. On 23 October 2014, the BFI announced film copies of two previously missing episodes – the first and final episodes of the series (broadcast 15 February 1967 and 7 November 1967) – had been recovered from the private collection of the show's executive producer David Frost. A year later, the BFI announced the recovery of another two episodes from a fan's collection, with one of the new recoveries - the third episode of the first series (tx 1 March 1967) – to be screened at the Radio Times Festival at Hampton Court on 25 September 2015.

Out of an original total of 13 episodes, eleven now exist in complete or near-complete form, while two remain incomplete. While most surviving episodes are from original tapes or telerecordings, two of the complete episodes have been reconstructed from footage recovered from five compilation tapes returned from Sweden. The two incomplete episodes' surviving footage also comes from these compilations. The complete audio of all 13 episodes exist, recorded off air by several fans.

A 1967 LP release featured sketches taken from the soundtrack of the show's first series, accompanied by a 7" single featuring newly recorded versions of "The Ferret Song" and "The Rhubarb Tart Song". These have since been reissued on CD.

Home media 
The five Swedish compilation episodes were released on DVD in July 2005 by Tango Entertainment in the US (Region 1) and in January 2007 by Pinnacle Vision in the UK (Region 2). This includes the Four Yorkshiremen sketch, written and performed by Cleese, Chapman, Brooke-Taylor and Marty Feldman. The DVD incorrectly states these as "recently recovered episodes", presents them as episode numbers 1 through 5, in the wrong compilation-series order (the correct order is DVD ep# 4, 3, 1, 5, 2), with no mention on the DVD that the content is in fact a compilation. The episodes on all DVD releases are soft, grainy, and generally low picture quality, even considering the material's age. Eric Idle appears in three of the episodes (2, 4, and 5), but never speaks except for a brief line in the teaser of episode 4.

The DVD was re-released in May 2012 by One Media iP, a digital-only (streaming media format) label (no physical DVD) based in the UK, available for free on their OMP YouTube channel. This release has the compilation episodes in the same (mis-)order, and includes the 2 bonus interview tracks from the original DVD as well. They describe the episodes as compilations, but their description of what original episodes they are taken from is wrong (one episode claims the excerpts are all from series 1 when in fact they are all from series 2).

In October 2015, One Media iP acquired the rights to three original full episodes that had recently been discovered, and released them on their YouTube channel as well. They are the two episodes discovered in David Frost's archives, ep. #1.1 and #2.7, and the episode discovered in a fan collection and screened in 2015, ep. #1.3. The three episodes are presented in the wrong aspect ratio: the picture is squeezed horizontally to a ratio of 1:1 square.

In recent years, some of the other surviving, original full episodes have been uploaded on YouTube and other video-sharing websites. All of these have since been removed, and new uploads continue to be removed, due to claimed copyright restrictions and new YouTube rules, as well as internet policing by One Media iP. The five compilation episodes (in the same mis-order) plus the three original full episodes released by One Media iP are still available for free on YouTube, on the free streaming service Tubi, and on Amazon Prime, the subscription streaming provider. On Tubi and Amazon Prime, the three original episodes are numbered 6 through 8 in order of broadcast: ep. #1.1, 1.3, and 2.7 respectively. On these latter two providers, the squeezed 1:1 aspect ratio of episode #7 (1.3) is corrected.

The British Film Institute released a comprehensive three-DVD set of the surviving material on 16 September 2019, including audio-only portions for all missing segments.

In July 2020, the BritBox streaming service has the thirteen episodes available for viewing.

Guest stars
 Barry Cryer as director in Chartered Accountants and Gorilla / first person to sit in Thief in Library / Nigerian guide & Eskimo guide in Studio Tour / Feldman in Scottish Opera / deerstalker hat detective in Detective Sketch / Wine waiter in Four Yorkshiremen / miscellaneous voice-over announcements
 Bill Oddie as depressed patient/Kowalski in Detective Sketch
 Christine Rodgers as Mrs. Lotterby / waving co-host / Susan / opera-host / introduces self in "I'm The Loveliest" show intro
 Eric Idle Librarian in Thief in Library / Beethoven patient / waiter / elevator operator in Detective Sketch / end of row opera patron in Scottish Opera
 Jo Kendall as Mary in John and Mary in Malaya / Sara Mellish in Studio Tour
 Mary Maude as Lady in bath / introduces self in "I'm The Loveliest" show intro
 Dick Vosburgh as director in Studio Tour / bearded front row patron in Scottish Opera
 Antony Jay stage manager in Studio Tour
 Frank Muir Jordanian entourage member in Studio Tour
 Denis Norden Jordanian entourage member in Studio Tour
 Ronnie Corbett wrestling stage hand in Studio Tour
 Frances Dean accented opera-host / introduces self in "I'm The Loveliest" show intro
 Karin Feddersen Long haired brunette patron in Scottish Opera
 Jacqueline Rochelle as magic amulet opera-host
 Penny Brahms introduces self in "I'm The Loveliest" show intro
 Joan Crane as receptionist in Spiv Doctor / introduces self in "I'm The Loveliest" show intro
 Vicki Murden
 Anne Lewington
 Natalie Shaw
 Jenny Walton
 Patricia Franklin
 Dick Holmes

List of episodes 
Not all ITV regions screened the series, and those that did so on different transmission dates and times, with the series beginning and ending at different times of the year.  Unless stated otherwise, the dates below reflect the transmission dates of the series in the London ITV region - Rediffusion's ITV franchise.

Audio recordings exist for all 13 episodes, with only a very few missing segments. These have been used to reconstruct the order of sketches in complete episodes.

Series 1 
Series 1 was not shown in the Granada region.

Series 2 
In the Granada region, each episode was shown three days after the dates specified below at 10.30 in the evening.

References

External links
Comedy Guide - At Last the 1948 Show at bbc.co.uk (Internet Archive copy)

British Film Institute Screen Online

1960s British television sketch shows
1967 British television series debuts
1967 British television series endings
Black-and-white British television shows
ITV sketch shows
English-language television shows
Monty Python
British satirical television series
Television shows produced by Associated-Rediffusion
Rediscovered television